Maculatoscelis gilloni is a species of praying mantis in the family Amorphoscelidae. It is found in Côte d'Ivoire.

See also
List of mantis genera and species

References

Amorphoscelidae
Mantodea of Africa
Insects described in 1964